The following is a list of the IRMA's number-one singles of 1994.

See also
1994 in music
List of artists who reached number one in Ireland

1994 in Irish music
1994 record charts
1994